Sumur may refer to:

 Sumur (Levant), a Bronze Age archaeological site and Phoenician city
 Sumur, Ladakh, a village in Nubra, India
 Sumur Batu, Kemayoran, a sub-village of Bekasi, a suburb of Jakarta, Indonesia
 Sumur Gumuling, a subterranean mosque in Yogyakarta, Indonesia

See also
 Sumer (disambiguation)
 Sumuru (disambiguation)